Charalambides is an avant garde musical group originally from Houston, Texas, United States and lately of Austin, Texas. Formed in 1991 (under the short-lived name Mutual Admiration Society) by Tom Carter, Christina Carter and Kyle Silfer, they have followed in the footsteps of other Texas psychedelic music artists such as the 13th Floor Elevators, and Red Crayola. Later members include Jason Bill and Heather Leigh Murray, but the band has long considered itself primarily a duo between Tom and Christina Carter.

The name of the band derives from the surname of a customer at the record shop where Tom and Christina met.

Their music contains elements typical of psychedelic music such as reverb, backwards recording, extended instrumental jamming and the use of found sounds.

In addition to several major releases on labels such as Kranky, Eclipse Records, and Time-Lag Records, they have also released many small edition CD-Rs on their own Wholly Other label, and other small independent labels, some of which have later been re-issued (Our Bed is Green, and Historic Sixth Ward for example).

Core members Tom Carter and Christina Carter are divorced but remain together as a musical unit. They have also released albums on Kranky and Eclipse Records under their own names, as well as several small edition CD-Rs. In addition the two have collaborated with numerous other musicians such as Loren Mazzacane Connors, Yellow Swans and Robert Horton.

Selected discography

Primary album releases on Siltbreeze and Kranky 
Our Bed Is Green CS-100 (No Label, 1993) Reissued as 2CD on Kranky, 2005
Union LP (Siltbreeze, 1993)
Market Square 2LP (Siltbreeze, 1995)
Houston CD (Siltbreeze, 1998)
Unknown Spin CD (Kranky, 2003)
Joy Shapes LP/CD (Kranky, 2004)
A Vintage Burden (Kranky, 2006)
Likeness  CD (Kranky, 2007)
Exile  LP/CD (Kranky, 2011)
Tom and Christina Carter  LP/CS (Drawing Room, 2018)

Limited edition album releases, self-released, CD-R's
Historic 6th Ward CS-90 (No Label, 1994) (Reissued as CD on (Wholly Other, 1996 and 2 LP on (Time-Lag Records, 2002)
Internal Eternal CD (Wholly Other, 1999)
Sticks CD-R (Wholly Other, 2000) 
Branches Lathe LP (Eclipse Records, 2001) Edition of 100 copies
YIH CD-R (Carbon Records, 2001) Limited to 100 copies
Untitled split CD-R (with Scorces) (Wholly Other, 2002) (Charalambides side reissued as Unknown Spin on Kranky, 2003)
Being As Is CD-R (Crucial Blast, 2002) Limited edition of 100 copies
CHT CD-R (Wholly Other, 2002) Limited edition CDr, 200 copies.
IN CR EA SE 2LP (Eclipse Records, 2002)
Emerald Message CD-R (Wholly Other, 2006) Recorded in Houston, 12/23/95 except for 4 recorded 12/22/95 as part of the _Internal Eternal_ sessions
Glowing Raw CD-R (Wholly Other, 2006) limited edition of 250 copies. Recorded 1995–98
Strangle The Wretched Heavens CD-R (Wholly Other, 2007) Recorded 1994–96
Electricity Ghost CD (Wholly Other, 2007) Recorded during the "Joy Shapes" Sessions in 2003
Rose/Thorn LP (Klang Industries, 2008)
Three-Lane Blacktop  LP (Two-Lane Blacktop, 2010) Edition of 500 copies.

Live albums
Charalambides CD (Wholly Other, 1997)
Home CD-R (Wholly Other, 2000)
Water CD-R (Wholly Other, 2001)
The Work Of Glaciers (Not On Label, 2001) 
Live Hand Held CD-R (Wholly Other, 2002) Limited edition CDr, 200 copies
Live/Dead CD-R (Wholly Other, 2005)
Dead/Live CD-R (Wholly Other, 2005)
Live At Graag Traag Festival #2 CDr, Ltd (Majjem Radio Recordings, 2012)

Singles, EP's, collaborations
"Devils"/"Bid You Goodnight" 7" (Playtime, 1995)
"Naked in Our Deathskins" on Harmony of the Spheres Comp 3LP (Reissued as 2CD, 1999) (Drunken Fish, 1996)
"Spring Leaves Fall"/"Sun or Wind" 7" (Timelag, 2002)
Ana/Kata 10" EP (Beta-lactam Ring Records, 2002)
'Charalambides / Pocahaunted - Split  (7", Single, Ltd, 2008)

Compilation appearances
"On the Corner"/"Winning Friends"/"13,14" on Heartland Comp CS-60 (Seagrave, 1994)
"Variant"/"Mayflower" on Drilling the Curve Comp LP (Fleece, 1995)
"Hyetal" on Whump! Comp 7" (Bobby J, 1996)
"Drop" on Succour Comp 2CD (Woronzow, 1996)
"Mansfield" on The Nature of Systems Comp CD (Carbon Records, 2000)
"One Song" on Serotonin Ronin Comp 2CD (Camera Obscura, 2000)
"Rehearsal" on Urban Meadows Comp CD (Broken Face, 2000)
"Second Rehearsal" on Songs From the Entopic Garden Volume 2 Split LP (with Six Organs of Admittance) (Timelag, 2001)
Untitled track on Intersect 4 Comp CD (Pale-Disk, 2002)
"Song for Always" on Ptolemaic Terrascope No. 32 comp CD (P.T., 2002)
Lactamase Bonus Compilation

External links 
Charalambides at Kranky
Interview with the band
Concert photos by Laurent Orseau
Everything is Magic interview with the band in Ascent Magazine
Charalambides on Last.FM

1991 establishments in Texas
American experimental musical groups
American folk musical groups
American post-rock groups
Musical groups established in 1991
Musical groups from Houston
Psychedelic rock music groups from Texas
Siltbreeze Records artists